Mantius is also a genus of jumping spiders.

In Greek mythology, Mantius (Ancient Greek: Μάντιος means "diviner, seer, prophet") was the son of Melampus and Iphianassa and the father of Cleitus, Polypheides and, in some versions, of Oicles.

Notes

References 

 Homer, The Odyssey with an English Translation by A.T. Murray, Ph.D. in two volumes. Cambridge, MA., Harvard University Press; London, William Heinemann, Ltd. 1919. . Online version at the Perseus Digital Library. Greek text available from the same website.
 Pausanias, Description of Greece with an English Translation by W.H.S. Jones, Litt.D., and H.A. Ormerod, M.A., in 4 Volumes. Cambridge, MA, Harvard University Press; London, William Heinemann Ltd. 1918. . Online version at the Perseus Digital Library
 Pausanias, Graeciae Descriptio. 3 vols. Leipzig, Teubner. 1903.  Greek text available at the Perseus Digital Library.

Characters in the Odyssey
Argive characters in Greek mythology